W. L. "Tay" Cook (1894 – March 20, 1985) was an Arizona politician who served in the Arizona House of Representatives, and was Speaker of that body from 1957 to 1962.

Born in Arizona, Cook was a cattle buyer and rancher. In 1948, he was elected as a Democrat to represent Willcox, Cochise County, in the legislature. He remained in that body until 1962, when he made an unsuccessful bid for a seat in the state senate, thereafter serving several additional terms in the state house beginning in 1964. He was interred at Willcox Cemetery.

Cook died of a heart attack at his home in Willcox at the age of 90, and was interred in that city's Sunset Cemetery.

References

1894 births
1985 deaths
People from Arizona
Speakers of the Arizona House of Representatives
Democratic Party members of the Arizona House of Representatives